{{DISPLAYTITLE:Nu2 Boötis}}

Nu2 Boötis is a white-hued binary star system in the northern constellation of Boötes. It is faintly visible to the naked eye with a combined apparent visual magnitude of 5.02. Based upon an annual parallax shift of 7.86 mas as seen from the Earth, it is located roughly 415 light years from the Sun. The system is moving closer to the Sun with a radial velocity of −16.6 km/s.

This stellar pair have a nearly circular orbit with a period of nine years and a semimajor axis of 0.0615 arc seconds. They are both of visual magnitude 5.80 and display a similar spectrum, with the primary, component A, being an A-type main sequence star with a stellar classification of A5 V. This has been identified as an A-type shell star, suggesting there is a circumstellar disk of gas orbiting one or both stars. There are two other stars that appear close to the pair, termed C and D, but they are physically unrelated.

References

External links
 
 

A-type main-sequence stars
Spectroscopic binaries
Bootis, Nu2
Boötes
Durchmusterung objects
Bootis, 53
138629
076041
5774